The 1981 Miami Hurricanes baseball team represented the University of Miami in the 1981 NCAA Division I baseball season. The Hurricanes played their home games at Mark Light Field. The team was coached by Ron Fraser in his 19th season at Miami.

The Hurricanes reached the College World Series, where they were eliminated after recording a win against  and losses to eventual runner-up Oklahoma State and third-place Texas.

Personnel

Roster

Coaches

Schedule and results

References

Miami Hurricanes baseball seasons
Miami Hurricanes
College World Series seasons
Miami Hurricanes baseball